Adam Woodward (born 10 June 1992) is a British actor and model, known for his two roles in Emmerdale first as Grant then as Nathan and is also known for portraying the role of Brody Hudson in the Channel 4 soap opera Hollyoaks. For his portrayal of Brody, he received the award for Best Male Dramatic Performance at the 2019 British Soap Awards.

Life and career
Prior to acting, Woodward studied Politics and worked as an underwear model. He then trained to become an actor at Act Up North, and made his debut appearance in the 2014 war film The War I Knew. Then in 2015, he appeared in an episode of the ITV soap opera Emmerdale as Grant; he later appeared again in 2017 as Nathan. Later in 2017, he was cast in the Channel 4 soap opera Hollyoaks as series regular Brody Hudson. For his portrayal of Brody, he has received various accolades, including winning Best Male Dramatic Performance at the 2019 British Soap Awards and Best Actor at the 2019 Inside Soap Awards.

Filmography

Awards and nominations

References

External links 
 

English male film actors
English male soap opera actors
Living people
1992 births